is a Japanese football player. He plays for FC Tokyo.

Career
Mao Kobayashi joined FC Tokyo in 2016. On September 11, he debuted in J3 League (v Grulla Morioka).

References

External links

1999 births
Living people
Association football people from Tokyo
Japanese footballers
J1 League players
J3 League players
FC Tokyo players
FC Tokyo U-23 players
Association football midfielders